Frank Wimberley (born August 31, 1926) is an African American abstract expressionist artist.

Biography

Frank Wimberley grew up in suburban New Jersey. After serving in the Army, he studied painting at Howard University with James Amos Porter, James Lesesne Wells, and Loïs Mailou Jones. There he developed an interest in jazz, which lead to friendships with Miles Davis, Ron Carter, and Wayne Shorter.

Wimberley is a longtime resident of Sag Harbor, NY. He and his wife Juanita moved there in the 1960s into a modernist house that they designed. In October 2020, T: The New York Times Style Magazine showcased the Wimberleys in their home in a feature on black families who settled in Sag Harbor in the 1930s and the decades after.

Work

Wimberley paints abstractly in acrylic paints, using a wide variety of tools including scrapers, spatulas, and brushes.

"Mr. Wimberley's canvases are entirely abstract, demanding to be taken for just what they are, pigment applied to cloth," wrote Helen A. Harrison for the New York Times in 1991. "Yet, in spite of the total lack of outside references, they conjure up a host of associations and implications."

Frank Wimberley is represented by Berry Campbell Gallery in New York City.

Critical reception

Writing about the artist's 1989 solo exhibition at the Fine Arts Center at the Southampton campus of Long Island University, New York Times critic Phyllis Braff wrote that Wimberley's "sweeping application of paint is the dominant action, serving as both theme and as principal generator of psychic energy." She credited the artist with a "forceful, imaginative and expressive use of color." Grace Glueck, writing for the paper in 2001 about Wimberley's exhibition at June Kelly Gallery in New York City, said that Wimberley's "paintings are good to behold: beautifully brushed and infused with a light that magnifies their intensity."

Critic Philip Barcio said of the work in Wimberley's 2019 exhibition at Berry Campbell Gallery, "The textures and surface qualities Wimberley coaxes from his paints make some appear like mirrors, and others like caverns into which the light seems to disappear. Some of his surfaces feel stand-offish, almost wounded. Others are as welcoming as a hug."

Selected museum collections
 David C. Driskell Center for the Study of Visual Arts and Culture of African Americans and the African Diaspora at the University of Maryland, College Park
 Islip Art Museum
 Saint Louis Art Museum
 Yale University Art Gallery

References

External links
 Frank Wimberley Art
 Frank Wimberley at Berry Campbell Gallery

1926 births
Living people
African-American artists
21st-century African-American people
20th-century African-American people